Vashkivtsi is a city in Vyzhnytsia Raion of Chernivtsi Oblast (province) of Ukraine. It is located in the historical region of Bukovina. It hosts the administration of Vashkivtsi urban hromada, one of the hromadas of Ukraine. Population: 

One village is administered by the town, Voloka (Волока; Voloca).

History 
City since 1940.

In January 1989 the population was 5811 people.

In January 2013 the population was 5406 people.

Transport 
 a railway station.

Natives
 John Hnatyshyn, Canadian lawyer, Senator and father of Ray Hnatyshyn, the twenty-fourth Governor General of Canada.
 Tina Karol, Ukrainian singer and songwriter, who represented her country in the Eurovision Song Contest 2006, placing seventh; her father is from Vashkivtsi.

References

External links
 

Cities in Chernivtsi Oblast
Cities of district significance in Ukraine
Duchy of Bukovina